Qannad (also Romanized as Qannād) is a village in Rud Ab-e Sharqi Rural District, Rud Ab District, Narmashir County, Kerman Province, Iran. At the 2006 census, its population was 620, in 151 families.

References 

Populated places in Narmashir County